California's 38th congressional district is a congressional district in the U.S. state of California based in suburban eastern Los Angeles County and Orange County, California.

The district covers several cities in southeastern Los Angeles and San Gabriel Valley areas including the cities of:

and the unincorporated communities of:

A small portion of Pomona and the Orange County city of La Habra are also included in the district.

The major cities generally reflect a Hispanic majority, while Diamond Bar and Walnut have an Asian-American majority.

Competitiveness

In statewide races

Notes

Composition

As of the 2020 redistricting, California's 38th congressional district is located in Southern California. It takes up part of Southeast Los Angeles County and the city of La Habra in Orange County.

Los Angeles County is split between this district, the 28th district, the 31st district, the 35th district, the 35th district, the 42nd district, and the 45th district. The 38th, 28th, 31st, and 35th are partitioned by E Pomona Blvd, Potrero Grande Dr, Arroyo Dr, Hill Dr, Montebello Blvd, N San Gabriel Blvd, Walnut Grove Ave, Whittier Narrows Recreation Area, N Lexington-Gallatin Rd, N Durfree Ave, E Thienes Ave, E Rush St, N Burkett Rd, Cunningham Dr, Eaglemont Dr, Oakman Dr, Arciero Dr, Grossmont Dr, Workman Mill Rd, Bunbury Dr, Fontenoy Ave, Ankerton, Whittier Woods Circle, Union Pacific Railroad, San Gabriel Freeway, N Peck Rd, Mission Mill Rd, Rose Hills Rd, Wildwood Dr, Clark Ave, San Jose Creek, Turnbull Canyon Rd, E Gale Ave, Pomona Freeway, Colima Rd, E Walnut Dr N, Nogales St, E Walnut Dr S, Fairway Dr, E Valley Blvd, Calle Baja, La Puente Rd, S Sentous Ave, N Nogales St, Amar Rd, Walnut City Parkland, San Bernardino Freeway, Fairplex Dr, Via Verde, Puddingstone Reservoir, McKinley Ave, N Whittle Ave, Arrow Highway, Fulton Rd, and Foothill Blvd.

The 38th, 34th and 42nd are partitioned by Simmons Ave, W Beverly Blvd, Via Corona St, Repetto Ave, Allston St, W Northside Dr, Yates Ave, E Acco St, 6866 E Washington Blvd-2808 Vail Ave, S 14th St, AT & SF Railway, Church Rd, Telegraph Rd, Rio Hondo River, Veterans Memorial Park, Suva St, Guatemala Ave, Shady Oak Dr, Coolgrove Dr, Gallatin Rd, Samoline Ave, Paramount Blvd, Arrington Ave, Suva St, Charloma Dr, Lubet St, Highway 5, and the San Gabriel River.

The 38th district takes in the cities of Whittier, Montebello, Norwalk, Pico Rivera, Diamond Bar, La Mirada, Walnut, and Santa Fe Springs, as well as the census-designated place Hacienda Heights.

Cities & CDP with 10,000 or more people
 Los Angeles - 3,898,747
 Norwalk - 102,773
 Whittier - 87,306
 Montebello - 62,640
 Pico Rivera - 62,088
 La Habra - 60,513
 Hacienda Heights - 55,386
 Diamond Bar - 55,072
 La Mirada - 48,008
 Walnut - 28,430
 Santa Fe Springs - 19,219

List of members representing the district

Election results

1962

1964

1966

1968

1970

1972

1974

1976

1978

1980

1982

1984

1986

1988

1990

1992

1994

1996

1998

2000

2002

2004

2006

2008

2010

2012

2014

2016

2018

2020

2022

Historical district boundaries
From 2003 through 2013, the district consisted of most of the San Gabriel Valley in Los Angeles County. Due to redistricting after the 2010 United States Census, the district has moved east and south east in Los Angeles County and includes much of the previous areas as well as Bellflower and Artesia.

See also
List of United States congressional districts

References

External links
GovTrack.us: California's 38th congressional district
RAND California Election Returns: District Definitions
California Voter Foundation map - CD38

38
Government of Los Angeles County, California
Government in Orange County, California
Artesia, California
Avocado Heights, California
Bellflower, California
Cerritos, California
La Palma, California
Lakewood, California
Montebello, California
Norwalk, California
Pico Rivera, California
Rosemead, California
Santa Fe Springs, California
Whittier, California
Constituencies established in 1963
1963 establishments in California